Several Canadian naval units have been named HMCS Saskatoon after the city;

 was a Flower-class corvette commissioned in 1941 and served until 1945 as a convoy escort.
 is a  that is currently in service. She was commissioned in 1998.

Battle Honours
Atlantic 1942-45

Badge
Vert a lion passant guardant crowned with a naval coronet Or sails Argent and grasping in the dexter paw a Saskatoon bush irradiated and fructed proper leaved Or.

Significance
The gold lion is taken from the symbol used by the City of Saskatoon. The lion wears a naval coronet, and grasps a Saskatoon bush thereby making reference to the name of the City.

Motto
FORTIS CEU LEO FIDUS (Brave as a faithful lion)

Notes

References

Royal Canadian Navy ship names